Nonkilling Global Political Science is a 2002 book written by political scientist Glenn D. Paige. In his book, Paige challenges the violence-accepting assumptions of the discipline of political science as a whole. Paige introduces the concept of nonkilling, which refers to the absence of killing, threats to kill, and conditions conducive to killing in human society.

The book has been translated into over two dozen languages and had led to convening the First Global Nonkilling Leadership Forum in Honolulu, Hawai‘i, 1–4 November 2007. The book spurred the creation of the Center for Global Nonkilling, a United Nations special consultative status nongovernmental organization, and has subsequently led to a body of scholarship, including dedicated issues in peace and conflict study journals.

See also 

 Center for Global Nonkilling
 Glenn D. Paige
 Nonkilling
 Nonviolence
 World peace

References

Further reading

 
A Nonkilling, Nonviolent World for the 21st Century, Mairead Maguire, 9th World Summit of Nobel Peace Laureates, 2007
Nonkilling Global Political Science, Balwant Bhaneja, Peace Magazine, January–March (2005), pp. 27
A Nonkilling Paradigm for Political Problem Solving, Balwant Bhaneja, Asteriskos: Journal of International and Peace Studies, Vol. 1 (2006), pp. 273–277
Special Issue on Glenn Paige and Nonkilling Political Science, Journal of Peace and Gandhian Studies, Vol.5, No. 1, 2004 
A Nonkilling Paradigm for Political Scientists, Psychologists, and Others, Charles E. Collyer, Peace and Conflict (2003), pp. 371–372, 

2002 non-fiction books
Political science books
Nonviolence